was an automobile manufacturer and subsidiary of the Mazda Motor Corporation. The company has existed from 1991 to 1995 and was also known under its nickname Mazda Two. M2 was responsible for the development and the production of vehicle parts, such as bodykits. The headquarters was inside the M2 Building in Tokyo, Japan. The showrooms of complete vehicles was inside the affiliated Setagaya Matsudarotari (Mazda Rotary) Building. The company was closed in 1995 and was a victim of the financial crisis of 1995. The vehicles of the brand were produced in only small numbers, making them a high priority for collectors. Most known M2 vehicles are currently registered in Japan although some have made it overseas to the USA.

Model overview

References

Mazda
Car manufacturers of Japan
Vehicle manufacturing companies established in 1991
Vehicle manufacturing companies disestablished in 1995